Cordaro is both a surname and a given name. Notable people with the name include:

People with the surname
Alessandro Cordaro, Belgian winger
Daniel Cordaro, American psychologist
Frank Cordaro, American peace activist
Martie Cordaro, president of the Omaha Storm Chasers
Mike Cordaro, former American football player

People with the given name
Cordaro Howard, retired American football guard
Cordaro Stewart, American rapper